Alked Çelhaka (born 7 August 1994) is an Albanian professional footballer who plays as a midfielder for Flamurtari FC in the Albanian Superliga.

Club career

Tirana
On 4 September 2017, Çelhaka joined Tirana on a three-year contract in club's first ever Albanian First Division season. He debuted two days later by playing in the 2017 Albanian Supercup against Kukësi which was won 1–0. This win constituted his first trophy win at Tirana. He made his first league appearance in the opening day against Iliria on 16 September. His first score-sheet contributions came later on 18 November where he scored the second of the 2–0 win over Apolonia Fier.

Flamurtari
On 11 September 2021, Çelhaka joined Flamurtari FC.

Career statistics

Honours

Tirana
 Albanian Supercup: 2017
 Albanian First Division : Winner Group B
 Albanian First Division : 2017-2018

References

External links
AFA profile

1994 births
Living people
Footballers from Kavajë
Albanian footballers
Association football midfielders
Besa Kavajë players
KF Laçi players
KF Tirana players
Flamurtari FC players
Kategoria Superiore players
Kategoria e Parë players